Colloredo is a surname that may refer to:

Colloredo-Mansfeld, German Princely family which was based in Austria
Rudolf von Colloredo (1585–1657), Field Marshal of the Holy Roman Empire, who fought in the Thirty Years' War
Count Hieronymus von Colloredo (1732–1812), Prince-Bishop of Gurk from 1761 and Prince-Archbishop of Salzburg from 1771 until 1803
Filippo di Colloredo-Mels (1778–1864), leader of the Sovereign Military Order of Malta
Hieronymus Karl Graf von Colloredo-Mansfeld (1775–1822), Austrian corps commander during the Napoleonic Wars
Lazarus and Joannes Baptista Colloredo (1617–1646), Italian conjoined twins who toured in 17th-century Europe
Mickaël Colloredo (born 1980), French football striker currently playing for French Ligue 2 side Nîmes Olympique
Sebastian Colloredo (born 1987), Italian ski jumper who has competed since 2002

See also
Colloredo di Monte Albano, comune (municipality) in the Province of Udine in the Italian region Friuli-Venezia Giulia
Villa Colloredo Mels - Civic Museum in Recanati, Marche

cs:Colloredo
it:Colloredo
sv:Colloredo